Haydon Spenceley (born 3 July 1984) is an English Christian musician and worship leader, who plays a Christian pop and EDM style of worship music. He has released three studio albums, Circles (2008), Heart Strings (2010), and Mirrors (2014).

Early life and personal life
Haydon Spenceley was born on 3 July 1984, while now he resides in Northampton, England. He has cerebral palsy, where this involves the use of a wheelchair for his mobility. He is an ordained minister in the Church of England.

Music career
His music recording career commenced in 2003, with the Christian alternative rock band, Freeslave, where he was their lead singer. He released, Circles, a studio album, on 10 February 2008. The subsequent studio album, Heart Strings, was released on 4 October 2010. Spenceley released, Mirrors, on 4 August 2014.

Discography
Studio albums
 Circles (10 February 2008)
 Heart Strings (4 October 2010)
 Mirrors (4 August 2014)

References

External links
 

1984 births
Living people
English Christians
British performers of Christian music
English songwriters